Tieling is one of 14 prefecture-level cities in Liaoning province of the People's Republic of China. Tieling is a city where coal mining is an important industry.

Demographics
As of the 2020 census, Tieling was home to 2,388,294 people, whom 699,675 lived in the built-up (or metro) area made of Yinzhou District and Tieling County, Qinghe District not being conurbated yet.
Tieling is a multiethnic area where the majority is Han and the minorities, like the Manchu, Korean, Mongolian, Hui, Xibo, Uygur, and ethnic Russians, live in a compact community. The minorities make up 23.2% of the total population.

Administrative divisions

Tieling has jurisdiction over 7 divisions:

Climate

Sightseeing

There are several sightseeing spots:
 Yingang Academy
 Longshou Mountain Mountain Scenic Area
 Chai River Reservoir
 Shangyang Lake Dam (an AAAA Level Sightseeing spot in Qinghe District, Tieling, also called Qinghe Dam
 Liao River Museum (In Lotus Lake Wetland Park)
 Lotus Lake Wetland Park (in Fanhe Town, Tieling)()

Economy
Tieling has abundant precious metal and mineral resources, including gold, silver, and aluminum.

References

External links

 Official web site (in Chinese)

 
Cities in Liaoning
Prefecture-level divisions of Liaoning